The 2010 Albirex Niigata season is Albirex Niigata's seventh consecutive season in J.League Division 1. It also includes the 2010 J.League Cup, and the 2010 Emperor's Cup.

Competitions

J.League

League table

Results summary

Results by round

J.League Cup

Group stage

Emperor's Cup

Players

First team squad

Out on loan

Starting XI 
Last updated on 3 February 2012.

Player statistics

References

External links
 J. League official site

Albirex Niigata
Albirex Niigata seasons